A panorama is a visual image display format in art or photography.

Panorama or panoramic may also refer to:

Arts and entertainment
 Moving panorama, a theatrical device using a long panoramic painting wound on a scroll
 Panorama (art)
 Panoramic painting, a type of large artwork
 Panoramic photography

Publications
 Panorama (Albania), an Albanian newspaper
 Panorama (Gibraltar), a Gibraltar newspaper
 Panorama (per masthead, officially Diario Panorama), a Venezuelan newspaper
 Panorama (magazine), an Italian magazine
 Panorama, the first (1925) magazine in the List of works by Kwee Tek Hoay#Magazines

Film and television
 Panorama, a section of the Berlin International Film Festival dedicated to queer cinema
 Panorama (British TV programme), a current affairs programme on BBC television
 Panorama (German TV program)
 Panorama (Polish TV program), a Polish news program on TVP2
 RelieF, formerly Panorama, a Canadian TV series

Music
 Panorama (music competition), an annual steelband competition held in Trinidad and Tobago
 National Panorama Competition (UK), an annual steelband competition held in the United Kingdom

Albums
 Panorama (The Cars album) or the title song (see below), 1980
 Panorama (6cyclemind album), 2005
 Panorama (Braintax album), 2006
 Panorama (La Dispute album), 2019
 Panorama: Live at the Village Vanguard, by Jim Hall, 1997
 Panoramic (album), by 32 Leaves, 2007
 Panorama, by Åsmund Åmli Band, 2008
 Panorama, by Cosmic Rough Riders, 2000
 Panorama, by Møme, 2016
 Panorama, by Kim Ho-joong, 2022

Songs
 "Panorama" (The Cars song), 1980
 "Panorama" (Nana Mizuki song), 2004
 "Panorama" (Iz*One song), 2020

Computing
 Panorama (database engine)
 Panorama (typesetting software), a text composition engine
 Panorama Tools, open source panorama creation and viewing software

Organizations
 Panorama Antennas, a British antenna manufacturer
 Panorama Records, possibly an early name for Profile Records
 Panorama Software, a Canadian business-intelligence software company
 Panorama Studios, a Dutch advertising agency based in Westland

Places

United States
 Panorama City, Los Angeles, California
 Panorama Park, Iowa
 Panorama Village, Texas
 Panorama (Montross, Virginia)

Canada
 Panorama Mountain Resort, near Invermere, British Columbia
 Panorama Lounge, former name of The One Eighty, in Toronto

Elsewhere
 Panorama, original non-Finnish name for Panoraama, a gyro tower amusement park attraction in Helsinki, Finland
 Panorama, Parow a suburb in South Africa

 Panorama, São Paulo, Brazil

 Panorama, South Australia, a suburb of Adelaide

 Panorama, Thessaloniki, Greece

Other uses

Carnival Panorama, a cruise ship* Fiat Panorama, a station wagon

 Fiat Panorama, a station wagon

 Freedom of panorama (Panoramafreiheit), a provision in the copyright law that allows taking pictures of public places

 Panorama, the placement of a monaural signal on a stereo bus in panning (audio)

Panorama (Semmering ski course), a women's tehnical ski course and traditional World Cup venue in Semmering, Austria

See also

 Mount Panorama Circuit, a motor racing circuit in Bathurst, New South Wales, Australia
 Panorama Hills (disambiguation)

 Panoramic (restaurant), a restaurant in Liverpool, England

 Panoramio, a geolocation-oriented photo sharing website